Tsvetanka Rangelova (born 31 August 1938) is a Bulgarian gymnast. She competed in six events at the 1960 Summer Olympics.

References

External links
 

1938 births
Living people
Bulgarian female artistic gymnasts
Olympic gymnasts of Bulgaria
Gymnasts at the 1960 Summer Olympics
Sportspeople from Haskovo Province